Barrow Hill Roundhouse, until 1948 known as Staveley Engine Shed, is a former Midland Railway roundhouse in Barrow Hill, near Staveley and Chesterfield, Derbyshire, now serving as a railway heritage centre.

History
Staveley Roundhouse was built to a standard Midland Railway square shed design in 1870 with a central turntable under cover. After 1948 it became known as Barrow Hill so as not to confuse it with the ex-Great Central shed nearby.  It was operational from 1870 until 9 February 1991.

The last shed foreman was Pete Hodges and the last person to sign on at Barrow Hill was Joe Denston, for the up sidings preparer.  The last locomotives to use the shed on its final day of operation were four diesels: Class 58 no. 58 016 came on shed at 11:00; Class 58 no. 58 027 came on shed at 11:30 and coupled up to 58 016; both Class 58s left for Worksop at 11:40; Class 20 nos. 20 197 and 20 073 arrived on shed at 12:00 and both Class 20 locomotives left for Worksop at 12:10, driven by driver Bob Hill.

Code
 Midland Railway: M24
 London Midland & Scottish: 18D
 British Railways Eastern region: 41E
 British Railways: BH (end of steam, 4 October 1965)

Preservation
After closure, the building was heavily vandalised. After lobbying of the local council, the building was Grade II listed by the Department of the Environment in February 1991. Following negotiations with the British Railways Property Board, Chesterfield Borough Council became the new owner of the shed and nearby yard on 20 December 1996.

The council subsequently granted a recurring maintenance lease to the Barrow Hill Engine Shed Society, which secured and refurbished the site, including renewal of the original 1870 roundhouse glass roof, except for one section. Funding was provided by the borough council, Derbyshire County Council, the Transport Trust, North Derbyshire Training and Enterprise Council, the European Regional Development Fund and the Government SRB fund. The site reopened to the public in July 1998.

Today, still retaining its connection to the UK national rail network through Network Rail, it is home to many preserved British railway locomotives.  The Harry Needle Railroad Company also stores and maintains a number of operational lease locomotives on site. As well as the main roundhouse building, Barrow Hill is also home to the former Pinxton Signal box. Relocated after closure, it has since been refurbished and fitted out as per a typical day in its last year of use for Network Rail.

Locomotives

Note: Only preserved locomotives are listed below. There are also various locomotives either stored or under repair that are not listed here, which are owned by commercial entities on site.
 Steam locomotives
 GER Class G58 (LNER Class J17)  no. 8217. Built in 1905. On loan from the National Railway Museum. On static display.
 GCR Class 11F (LNER Class D11)  no. 506 Butler Henderson. Built in 1919. On loan from the National Railway Museum. On static display.
 MR 156 Class  no. 158A. Built in 1866. On loan from the National Railway Museum. On static display.
 MR 1000 Compound Class  no. 1000. Built in 1902. On loan from the National Railway Museum. On static display.
 MR 1F "Half-cab" 1377 Class  No 41708. Built in 1878. under overhaul.
 GWR 5101 Class  no. 5164. Built in 1930. On loan from the Severn Valley Railway. On static display.
 Hunslet Engine Company "Austerity"  Works no. 3192, Running no. 68006. Built in 1955. Under overhaul.
 Hawthorn Leslie  no. 2491 Henry. Built in 1901. On static display.
 Vulcan Foundry  no. 3272 Vulcan. Built in 1918. Operational.
 Manning Wardle  no. 1795. Built in 1903. Under restoration.
Diesel locomotives
 Drewry Car Co.  no. 2589 Harry. Built in 1956. Operational.
 BR  Class 02 no. 02 003 (D2853) in BR Green. Built in 1960. Operational.
 BR  Class 02 no. D2868 in BR Green. Built in 1960. Operational.
 BR  Class 03 no. 03 066 (D2066) in BR Blue. Built in 1959. Operational.
 BR  Class 07 no. 07 012 (D2996) in BR Blue. Built in 1962. On display.
 BR Class 10 no. D4092 in BR Green. Built in 1962. On display.
 BR Bo-Bo Class 23 "Baby Deltic" no. D5910. New-build, launched in September 2010, re-creating an example of a long-lost class using body components from Class 37 no. 37 372
 BR Bo-Bo Class 26 no. 26 007 (D5300) in Railfreight Red Stripe. Built in 1958. Operational.
 BR Bo-Bo Class 27 no. 27 066 (D5386/27 103) in BR Blue. Built in 1962. Stored.
 BR Bo-Bo Class 33 no. 33 108 (D6521) in BR Blue. Built in 1960. Currently on loan to Severn Valley Railway (Owned by 33/1 Preservation Company)
 BR 1Co-Co1 Class 40 no. D213 (40 013) Andania in BR Green. Built in 1959. (Currently on loan to Locomotive Services Limited, Crewe DMD)
 BR 1Co-Co1 Class 45 no. 45 060 (D100) Sherwood Forester in BR Blue. Built in 1961. (Owned by Pioneer Diesel Locomotive Group). Operational.
 BR 1Co-Co1 Class 45 no. 45 105 (D86) in BR Blue. Built in 1961. (Owned by Pioneer Diesel Locomotive Group). Undergoing restoration.
 BR Co-Co Class 55 no. D9009 (55 009) Alycidon in BR Blue. Built in 1961. (Owned by Deltic Preservation Society). Operational.
 BR Co-Co Class 55 no. D9015 (55 015) Tulyar in BR Green. Built in 1961. (Owned by Deltic Preservation Society). Undergoing overhaul.
 BR Co-Co Class 55 no. 55 019 (D9019) Royal Highland Fusilier in BR Blue. Built in 1961. (Owned by Deltic Preservation Society). Operational.
Electric locomotives
 BR Bo-Bo Class 81 no. 81 002  BR Blue. Built in 1960. (AC Locomotive Group)
 BR Bo-Bo Class 82 no. 82 008. Intercity Executive. Built in 1961. (AC Locomotive Group)
 BR Bo-Bo Class 83 no. E3035 (83 012). Electric Blue. Built in 1961 (AC Locomotive Group)
 BR Bo-Bo Class 85 no. 85 006  Built in 1961. (AC Locomotive Group)
 BR Co-Co Class 89 no. 89 001. Built in 1986. Intercity Executive. (AC Locomotive Group)

Rail-Ale Festival
There is a CAMRA beer festival at Barrow Hill Roundhouse in May each year which attracts brewers and cider makers from around the country. A train operates to give rides to visitors.

Citations

See also
Listed buildings in Staveley, Derbyshire

References

External links

 Barrow Hill Roundhouse website

Midland Railway
Railway museums in England
Heritage railways in Derbyshire
Railway roundhouses in the United Kingdom
Museums in Derbyshire
Grade II listed buildings in Derbyshire
Railway depots in England